The  National Ioakeimeion Girls' High School of Constantinople, commonly known as the Ioakeimeion Girls' High School (Ιωακείμειον Παρθεναγωγείον) is a defunct Greek Orthodox secondary education institution for girls located in Fener quarter of Istanbul, Turkey.

History
After the 1850s, the establishment of a secondary school for girls of the Greek community in the Balat area became necessary because the Greek high school in Pera was quite far and expensive. The Ecumenical Patriarch of Constantinople Joachim II donated land for the construction of a school building. As he died before the realization, his successor Joachim III laid the foundation of the school building in 1879. The school started operating three years later.

The number of female students of the school reached 590 in 1910. In 1988, the high school was closed due to lack of students to enroll.

After its closing, the nearby Phanar Greek High School for Boys transitioned to mixed education.

References

Sources
 
 

Buildings and structures in Istanbul
Educational institutions established in 1879
Education in the Ottoman Empire
Fatih
Golden Horn
High schools in Istanbul
Greeks from the Ottoman Empire
School buildings completed in 1879
Eastern Orthodox schools
Greeks in Istanbul
Minority schools
Defunct schools in Turkey
1988 disestablishments in Turkey
Defunct girls' schools
Defunct secondary schools
Educational institutions disestablished in 1988
1879 establishments in the Ottoman Empire
19th-century architecture in Turkey